The Mitsubishi Fuso Aero King (kana:三菱ふそう・エアロキング) is a series of heavy-duty double-decker coaches built by Mitsubishi Fuso Truck and Bus Corporation.

The Aero King first went on sale in 1984, after being introduced at the 1983 Tokyo Motor Show. It can be either built as an integral bus or a bus chassis.

The engines that were used in the Fuso Aero Bus were the 8DC9 (turbocharged V-8, used between 1984 and 1995 for MU515TA/MU525TA), the 8M21-3 (NA V-8, /, used between 1995 and 2005 for MU612) and the 6M70-T4 (turbocharged L-6, 420ps, used between 2008 and 2010 for MU66JS) .

Models
P-MU515TA/525TA (1984)
U-MU525TA (1990)
KC-MU612TA (1995)
MU612TX (2000)
BKG-MU66JS (2008)

See also

Hino Grand View
List of buses
Mitsubishi Fuso Truck and Bus Corporation
Nissan Diesel Space Dream

References

External links 
Mitsubishi Fuso Aero King

Aeroking
Bus chassis
Double-decker buses
Coaches (bus)
Cab over vehicles
Buses of Japan
Full-size buses
Vehicles introduced in 1984
Tri-axle buses